The Solvay Public Library is a historic Carnegie library building located at Solvay at Onondaga County, New York.  It was built between 1903 and 1905, and is a one-story, buff-colored brick building on a high basement.  It has a hipped roof and Classical Revival style design elements including a distyle-in-antis portico in the Ionic order.  It was built in part with a $10,000 donation from Andrew Carnegie.

It was listed on the National Register of Historic Places in 2007.

It was renovated in recent years with focus on preserving and restoring historically accurate details.

References

Carnegie libraries in New York (state)
Libraries on the National Register of Historic Places in New York (state)
Library buildings completed in 1903
Neoclassical architecture in New York (state)
Buildings and structures in Onondaga County, New York
National Register of Historic Places in Onondaga County, New York